KXCA (1050 AM) is a radio station broadcasting an Urban Adult Contemporary format. Licensed to Lawton, Oklahoma, United States, the station serves the Lawton area. The station is currently owned by Mollman Media, Inc.  Studios and transmitter are located on Flower Mound Road in eastern Lawton.

Translators

References

External links
 Heart & Soul 93.7 & 1050 Facebook

XCA
Urban adult contemporary radio stations in the United States